Several minor league baseball teams have been based in Salinas, California and played in the California League.

Salinas Spurs

The  Salinas Spurs were a California League team that played from 1982 to 1987 and again from 1989 to 1992. Located in Salinas, California, they were affiliated with the Chicago Cubs from 1982 to 1983, the Seattle Mariners from 1984 to 1987, and in 1989 they had a partial working agreement with the San Francisco Giants. That season, they had seven Japanese players play for them.

They did not play as the Salinas Spurs in 1988, because they moved to Riverside, California to become the Riverside Red Wave. Baseball returned to Salinas after the Fresno Suns moved there for the 1989 season and became the Spurs.
Their last affiliation (a partial one) was with the Chicago White Sox in their final season in 1992, when they had half the roster of Japanese players with agreements with Japanese professional baseball leagues.

Notable alumni

Andy Allanson
 Thad Bosley (1976)
 Tom Brunansky (1979) MLB All-Star
Dave Burba (1987)
 Phil Cavarretta (1964, MGR) 4x MLB All-Star; 1945 NL Most Valuable Player
 Mark Clear (1977-1978) 2x MLB All-Star
 Dave Collins (1974)
 Julio Cruz (1976) 
Todd Cruz (1991)
Leon Durham (1990) 2x MLB All-Star
Dave Engle (1978) MLB All-Star
Billy Hatcher (1982)
 David Hardy (1987)
 Bud Harrelson (1963-1964) 2x MLB All-Star
Billy Hatcher (1982)
Steve Howe MLB All-Star; 1980 NL Rookie of the Year
Darrin Jackson (1983)
 Mack Jones (1958)
 Joe Maddon (1977-1978) MLB MGR: 3x MLB Manager of the Year (2008, 2011, 2015); MGR: 2016 World Series Champion – Chicago Cubs
 Rance Mulliniks (1975)
Jeff Nelson (1987) MLB All-Star
 Gary Pettis (1980) 5 x Gold Glove
 Dennis Rasmussen (1980)
 Buck Rodgers (1975, MGR) 1987 NL Manager of the Year
 Ken Schrom (1977) MLB All-Star
 Dick Selma (1963)
Mac Suzuki (1992)
Roy Thomas
 Dickie Thon (1977) MLB All-Star
Gary Varsho (1983)
Omar Vizquel (1987) 11x Gold Glove; 3x MLB All-Star
 Mike Witt (1979) 2 x MLB All-Star

Year-by-year record

Salinas Angels
The Salinas Angels were a California League baseball team based in Salinas, California, USA that played from 1976 to 1980. They played their home games at Salinas Municipal Stadium.

The team made the California League playoffs in 1976 and 1977, reaching (and losing) the league finals in each of those seasons.

Each season, the team had a new manager. The team's managers, by year: Del Crandall (1976), Moose Stubing (1977), Chuck Cottier (1978), Chris Cannizzaro (1979) and Tom Zimmer (1980).

Notable players include major league All-Stars Tom Brunansky, Mark Clear, Dave Engle, Ken Schrom, Dickie Thon and Mike Witt.

Salinas Packers
There were two incarnations of the baseball team known as the Salinas Packers. The first existed from 1954 to 1958, and was affiliated with the Pittsburgh Pirates in 1955 and the Milwaukee Braves from 1956 to 1958. The second incarnation existed from 1973 to 1975, and was affiliated with the California Angels. They played their home games at Municipal Stadium in the second incarnation. Both incarnations were located in Salinas, California and played in the California League.

In 1957, they won the California League title. One of their players, John Balaz, was named MVP in 1973. In 1976, they were renamed the Salinas Angels.

Year-by-year record

Salinas Indians
The Salinas Indians were a California League baseball team based in Salinas, California, USA that played in 1965. They were managed by Phil Cavarretta and were affiliated with the Cleveland Indians. Their home stadium was Salinas Municipal Stadium.

Multiple major leaguers played for the team, including Frank Baker, Gary Boyd, Larry Foster, Gomer Hodge, Ray Miller, Dave Nelson, Sam Parrilla, Richie Scheinblum and Oscar Zamora.

References

External links
Baseball Reference

Defunct baseball teams in California
Professional baseball teams in California
Sports in Salinas, California
Defunct California League teams
Chicago Cubs minor league affiliates
California Angels minor league affiliates
Cleveland Guardians minor league affiliates
New York Mets minor league affiliates
Milwaukee Braves minor league affiliates
Pittsburgh Pirates minor league affiliates
San Francisco Giants minor league affiliates
Seattle Mariners minor league affiliates
Baseball teams established in 1954
1954 establishments in California
1992 disestablishments in California
Baseball teams disestablished in 1992